The Diocese of Nassau may refer to:

Anglican Diocese of Nassau
Roman Catholic Diocese of Nassau